Ministry of Transport, Information Technology and Communications of Bulgaria is a Bulgarian government ministry, part of which are:
 Information Technology Directorate, concerned on policies for the development of IT in Bulgaria
 Electronic Government Directorate - electronic government policies in Bulgaria
 European Coordination and International Cooperation Directorate - European Union policies

Current Minister is Hristo Aleksiev.

The Ministry was known simply as the Ministry of Transport from 1966-1999.

Transport Troops 
The troops of the Ministry of Transport, called the Transport Troops (:bg:Войски_на_Министерството_на_транспорта, ВМT) (or Railway Troops), were a paramilitary construction organization subordinate to the Ministry of Transport, which existed from 1975 to 2001. It dealt mainly with the construction of highways and railways. They were divided into railway construction brigades and automobile transportation brigades tasked with the construction and maintenance of transport infrastructure. In case of war the Transport Troops would have come under the Ministry of People's Defence.

By Decree № 4 of January 14, 1888, the first paramilitary railway unit was established - the Railway Company of the Pioneer Regiment in Ruse. The first railway officer in Bulgaria was the future general Petar Lolov.

The Transport Troops themselves were established by Decree № 147 of 27 January 1975 on the basis of the Railway and Liaison Construction Brigade of the Ministry of Transport, established in 1965.

References

External links
 Official site (English)

Transport, Information Technology and Communications
Bulgaria
Bulgaria
Information technology in Bulgaria
1912 establishments in Bulgaria
Transport organizations based in Bulgaria